Ki-Ke-In, also known as Chuuchkamalthnii,  Haa'yuups,  and Ron Hamilton is a Nuu-chah-nulth cultural figure from the Hupacasath First Nation. His work includes sculpture, drawings, paintings, dance, song, writing, regalia and curatorial activities which document the ceremonial life of his people. A resident of Port Alberni, Ki-ke-in's exhibition of his own and historical Nuu-chah-nulth ceremonial curtains at the University of British Columbia formed part of the 2010 Vancouver Cultural Olympiad. A fisherman by trade, the resources he works with are Campbell River slate, wood, silver, gold, and ivory, often modelling his work on the sea serpent.

In 2006, he worked for a month with the National Museum of the American Indian, "writing artifact descriptions and a chapter in the accompanying exhibit book" and singing "an ancient ciquaa (prayer chant)" and "speaking to the artifacts in his language and assuring them they are safe and in a good place." 
 In 2018, he was named co-curator of a "multi-year project to restore and conserve a section that highlights First Nations cultures of the Pacific Northwest" at the American Museum of Natural History.

References

External links
http://www.artandeducation.net/announcements/view/940
http://www.ccca.ca/c/writing/j/jensen/jen001t.html

Living people
1948 births
20th-century First Nations people
21st-century First Nations people
Artists from British Columbia
Nuu-chah-nulth people
People from Port Alberni